HMS Charles was a 96-gun first-rate ship of the line of the Royal Navy, built by Christopher Pett at Deptford Dockyard until his death in March 1668, then completed by Jonas Shish after being launched in the same month. Her name was formally Charles the Second, but she was known simply as Charles, particularly after 1673 when the contemporary Royal Charles was launched.

Charles was renamed HMS St George in 1687 and reclassified as a second rate in 1691. In 1699–1701 she was rebuilt at Portsmouth Dockyard as a 90-gun second rate. In 1707, she belonged to Admiral Sir Cloudesley Shovell's fleet. Under the command of Captain James Lord Dursley, she saw action during the unsuccessful Battle of Toulon and was present during the great naval disaster off the Isles of Scilly when Shovell and four of his ships (Association, Firebrand, Romney and Eagle) were lost, claiming the lives of nearly 2,000 sailors. St George also struck rocks off Scilly, but got off.

St George was taken to pieces at Portsmouth in 1726 to be rebuilt again. On 4 September 1733, St George was ordered to be rebuilt to the 1733 proposals of the 1719 Establishment. She was relaunched on 3 April 1740.

She was eventually broken up in September 1774.

Notes

References

 Lavery, Brian (2003) The Ship of the Line - Volume 1: The development of the battlefleet 1650-1850. Conway Maritime Press. .
 Winfield, Rif (2009) British Warships in the Age of Sail 1603-1714: Design, Construction, Careers and Fates. Seaforth Publishing. .
 Winfield, Rif (2007) British Warships in the Age of Sail 1714-1792: Design, Construction, Careers and Fates. Seaforth Publishing. .

External links
 

Maritime incidents in 1707
Ships of the line of the Royal Navy
1660s ships